The Fujifilm XQ2 is a digital ultracompact camera announced by Fujifilm on January 15, 2015. It distinguishes itself from the predecessor XQ1 with the addition of a Classic Chrome film simulation mode.

References

External links
Specifications

XQ2
Live-preview digital cameras
Cameras introduced in 2015